Kwannam is a traditional Korean term used to refer to the southern region of Hamgyong province, including portions of modern-day North Hamgyong and South Hamgyong, North Korea.  Its literal meaning is "South of the Ridge", the ridge (Korean, kwan)in question being Mach'ŏnnyŏng 마천령 摩天嶺. The term is no longer in common use.

See also
Eight Provinces of Korea
Geography of North Korea

Regions of Korea